RaVen Quartet was a London-based string quartet that performed arrangements of both classical and rock music. The quartet performed with Madness during the 2012 London Olympics closing ceremony. The group separated in 2014.

Members

Stephanie Benedetti
Stephanie Benedetti was one of the group's violinists. Her sister is Scottish classical violinist Nicola Benedetti. Stephanie is currently a member of British pop group Clean Bandit.

Natalie Holt
The group's viola player, Natalie Holt, is a British classical musician and film composer. She hit the headlines in 2013 after interrupting the final of the seventh series of Britain's Got Talent.

Rachael Lander
Rachael Lander was the group's cellist.

Kirsty Mangan
Kirsty Mangan was one of the group's violinists.

References

British string quartets
Musical groups established in 2007
Musical groups from London
2007 establishments in England